Rajesh Yadav may refer to:

 Rajesh Yadav (cinematographer), Indian cinematographer
 Rajesh Yadav (politician) (born 1969), Indian politician
 Rajesh Yadav (cricketer) (born 1965), Indian cricketer